Flight 28 may refer to:

American Airlines Flight 28, crashed on 23 October 1942
British Airtours Flight 28M, fire on the ground on 22 August 1985

0028